Bill Moyers (born Billy Don Moyers, June 5, 1934) is an American journalist and political commentator. Under the Johnson administration he served from 1965 to 1967 as the eleventh White House Press Secretary.  He was a director of the Council on Foreign Relations, from 1967 to 1974.  He also worked as a network TV news commentator for ten years. Moyers has been extensively involved with public broadcasting, producing documentaries and news journal programs, and has won numerous awards and honorary degrees for his investigative journalism and civic activities. He has become well known as a trenchant critic of the corporately structured U.S. news media.

Early years and education

Born Billy Don Moyers in Hugo in Choctaw County in southeastern Oklahoma, he is the son of John Henry Moyers, a laborer, and Ruby Johnson Moyers. Moyers was reared in Marshall, Texas.

Moyers began his journalism career at 16 as a cub reporter at the Marshall News Messenger. In college, he studied journalism at the North Texas State College in Denton, Texas. In 1954, US Senator Lyndon B. Johnson employed him as a summer intern and eventually promoted him to manage Johnson's personal mail. Soon after, Moyers transferred to the University of Texas at Austin, where he wrote for The Daily Texan newspaper. In 1956, he graduated with a Bachelor of Arts degree in Journalism. While in Austin, Moyers served as assistant news editor for KTBC radio and television stations, owned by Lady Bird Johnson, wife of Senator Johnson. During the academic year 1956–1957, he studied issues of church and state at the University of Edinburgh in Scotland as a Rotary International Fellow. In 1959, he completed a Master of Divinity degree at the Southwestern Baptist Theological Seminary in Fort Worth, Texas. Moyers served as Director of Information while attending SWBTS. He was also a Baptist pastor in Weir in Williamson County, near Austin.

Moyers was ordained in 1954. Moyers planned to enter a Doctor of Philosophy program in American Studies at the University of Texas. During Senator Johnson's unsuccessful bid for the 1960 Democratic U.S. presidential nomination, Moyers served as a top aide, and in the general campaign he acted as liaison between Democratic vice-presidential candidate Johnson and the Democratic presidential nominee, U.S. Senator John F. Kennedy.

Kennedy and Johnson administrations

The Peace Corps

The Peace Corps was established by President Kennedy by Executive Order in March 1961, but it was up to top aide Sargent Shriver and Bill Moyers to find the funding to actually establish the organization. The Peace Corp Act was signed by President Kennedy on September 22, 1961. In Sarge, Scott Stossel reports that "Peace Corps legend has it that between them Moyers and Shriver personally called on every single member of Congress."

Reflecting 25 years later on the creation of the program Moyers said: ”We knew from the beginning that the Peace Corps was not an agency, program, or mission. Now we know—from those who lived and died for it—that it is a way of being in the world." At the 50th Anniversary “Salute to Peace Corps Giants,” hosted by the National Archives, Moyers said, "The years we spent at the Peace Corps were the best years of our lives.” Moyers gave the same answer in the famed Vanity Fair Proust questionnaire in 2011.

Moyers served first as associate director of public affairs and then as Sargent Shriver's deputy director before becoming special assistant to President Lyndon B. Johnson in November 1963.

Corporation for Public Broadcasting

Bill Moyers was a key player in the creation of the public broadcasting system.  When, in 1961, FCC Chairman Newton Minnow labeled television a  “vast wasteland” and called for programming in the public interest, the Johnson Administration instituted a study of the issue. The Carnegie Corporation of New York established a commission to study the value of and need for noncommercial educational television. Bill Moyers served on this committee, which released its report 'Public Television: A Program for Action,' in 1967.  Moyers said of the endeavor: “We became a central part of the American consciousness and a valuable institution within our culture."

Moyers was influential in creating the legislation that would fulfill the committee's recommendations. In 1967, President Johnson signed Public Broadcasting Act of 1967. (1) it is in the public interest to encourage the growth and development of public radio and television broadcasting, including the use of such media for instructional, educational, and cultural purposes;

On the 50th anniversary of the Public Broadcasting Act, Moyers and Joseph A. Califano, Jr. spoke about their experience with WNET.

Johnson Administration

When Lyndon B. Johnson took office after the Kennedy assassination, Moyers became a special assistant to Johnson, serving from 1963 to 1967. Moyers and Pamela Turnure are the last surviving people identifiable in the photograph taken of Johnson's swearing in. He played a key role in organizing and supervising the 1964 Great Society legislative task forces and was a principal architect of Johnson's 1964 presidential campaign. Moyers acted as the President's informal chief of staff from October 1964 until 1966. From July 1965 to February 1967, he also served as White House press secretary.

After the resignation of White House Chief of Staff Walter Jenkins because of a sexual misdemeanor in the run up to the 1964 election, President Lyndon B. Johnson, alarmed that the opposition was framing the issue as a security breach, ordered Moyers to request FBI name checks on 15 members of Goldwater's staff to find "derogatory" material on their personal lives. Goldwater himself only referred to the Jenkins incident off the record. The Church Committee stated in 1975 that "Moyers has publicly recounted his role in the incident, and his account is confirmed by FBI documents." In 2005, Laurence Silberman wrote that Moyers denied writing the memo in a 1975 phone call, telling him the FBI had fabricated it. Moyers said he had a different recollection of the telephone conversation.

Moyers also sought information from the FBI on the sexual preferences of White House staff members, most notably Jack Valenti. Moyers indicated his memory was unclear on why Johnson directed him to request such information, "but that he may have been simply looking for details of allegations first brought to the president by Hoover."

Under the direction of President Johnson, Moyers gave J Edgar Hoover the go-ahead to discredit Martin Luther King, played a part in the wiretapping of King, discouraged the American embassy in Oslo from assisting King on his Nobel Peace Prize trip, and worked to prevent King from challenging the all-white Mississippi delegation to the 1964 Democratic National Convention.

Moyers approved (but had nothing to do with the production) of the infamous "Daisy Ad" against Barry Goldwater in the 1964 presidential campaign. Goldwater blamed him for it, and once said of Moyers, "Every time I see him, I get sick to my stomach and want to throw up."  The ad is considered the starting point of the modern-day harshly negative campaign ad.

Journalist Morley Safer in his 1990 book "Flashbacks" wrote that Moyers and President Johnson met with and "harangued" Safer's boss, CBS president Frank Stanton, about Safer's coverage of the Marines torching Cam Ne village in the Vietnam War.
During the meeting, Safer alleges, Johnson threatened to expose Safer's "communist ties". This was a bluff, according to Safer. Safer says that Moyers was "if not a key player, certainly a key bystander" in the incident. Moyers stated that his hard-hitting coverage of conservative presidents Reagan and Bush was behind Safer's 1990 allegations.

In The New York Times on April 3, 1966, Moyers offered this insight on his stint as press secretary to President Johnson: "I work for him despite his faults and he lets me work for him despite my deficiencies." On October 17, 1967, he told an audience in Cambridge that Johnson saw the war in Vietnam as his major legacy and, as a result, was insisting on victory at all costs, even in the face of public opposition. Moyers felt such a continuation of the conflict would tear the country apart. "I never thought the situation could arise when I would wish for the defeat of LBJ, and that makes my current state of mind all the more painful to me," he told them. "I would have to say now: It would depend on who his opponent is."

The full details of his rift with Johnson were not made public. However, an Oval Office tape which was recorded following Johnson's public announcement that he would not seek re-election on March 31, 1968, suggested that Moyers and Johnson were still in contact after Moyers left the White House, with Moyers even encouraging the President to change his mind about running.

Journalism

Newsday
Moyers served as publisher for the Long Island, New York, daily newspaper Newsday from 1967 to 1970. The conservative publication had been unsuccessful, but Moyers led the paper in a progressive direction, bringing in leading writers such as Pete Hamill, Daniel Patrick Moynihan, and Saul Bellow, and adding new features and more investigative reporting and analysis. Circulation increased and the publication won 33 major journalism awards, including two Pulitzer Prizes. But the owner of the paper, Harry Guggenheim, a conservative, was disappointed by the liberal drift of the newspaper under Moyers, criticizing the "left-wing" coverage of Vietnam War protests. The two split over the 1968 presidential election, with Guggenheim signing an editorial supporting Richard Nixon, when Moyers supported Hubert Humphrey. Guggenheim sold his majority share to the then-conservative Times-Mirror Company over the attempt of newspaper employees to block the sale, even though Moyers offered $10 million more than the Times-Mirror purchase price; Moyers resigned a few days later.

CBS News
In 1976 Moyers joined CBS News, where he worked as editor and chief correspondent for CBS Reports until 1981, then as senior news analyst and commentator for the CBS Evening News with Dan Rather from 1981 to 1986. He was the last regular commentator for the network broadcast. During his last year at CBS, Moyers made public statements about declining news standards at the network and declined to renew his contract with CBS, citing commitments with PBS.

NBC News
Moyers briefly joined NBC News in 1995 as a senior analyst and commentator, and the following year he became the first host of sister cable network MSNBC's Insight program. He was the last regular commentator on the NBC Nightly News.

PBS

Bill Moyers Journal (1972–1981)
In 1971 Moyers began working for the Public Broadcasting System (PBS). His first PBS series, titled This Week with Bill Moyers, aired in 1971 and 1972.

Bill Moyers Journal ran on PBS from 1972 until 1981 with a hiatus from 1976 to 1977. He later hosted a show with this title from 2007 to 2010.

In 1975, Bill Moyers Journal aired Rosedale: The Way It Is, documenting the furor after the first Black family moved into Rosedale, Queens — including a rash of fire bombings. Forty-five years later a graduate student drew attention to a short segment recording the reactions of a group of black girls trying to make sense of the virulent racist attack they'd just experienced. The New York Times picked up on the story and found the children and others featured in the documentary and produced its own reported feature: " A Racist Attack on Children Was Taped in 1975. We Found Them."

Individual programs (1982–2006)

From 1982 through 2006, 70 different documentaries, interviews or limited series produced and hosted by Moyers ran on PBS stations.

Individuals interviewed and profiled included:
Mortimer J. Adler (Six Great Ideas, 1982)
Joseph Campbell (Joseph Campbell and the Power of Myth, 1988)
Robert Bly (A Gathering of Men, 1990)
John Henry Faulk (The Man who Beat the Blacklist, 1990)
Bernice Johnson Reagon (The Songs are Free, 1991)
Sam Keen (Your Mythic Journey, 1991)
Oren Lyons (The Faithkeeper, 1991)
Elie Wiesel (Facing Hate, 1991)
Donald Hall and Jane Kenyon (A Life Together, 1993)
Janet Reno (Attorney General Janet Reno, 1993)
Rita Dove (Poet Laureate Rita Dove, 1994)
Pete Seeger (Pure Pete Seeger, 1994)
Huston Smith (The Wisdom of Faith, 1996)
Bill T. Jones (Still/Here, 1997)
Desmond Tutu (Archbishop Tutu, 1999)
George Lucas (The Mythology of Star Wars, 1999)

Moyers also hosted a 6-part interview series called Creativity in 1982 and a 42-part interview series A World of Ideas from 1988–1990 which featured a companion book.

Topics of Moyers broadcasts included:
History – A Walk Through the 20th Century (1982–1984), From D-Day to the Rhine (1990), The Power of the Past: Florence (1990), The Arab World (1991), Presenting Mr. Frederick Douglass (1994)
Religion – Heritage Conversations (1986), God and Politics (1987), Amazing Grace (1990), The New Holy War (1993), Genesis: A Living Conversation (1996), Faith and Reason (2006)
Morality – Facing Evil (1988), Beyond Hate (1991), Hate on Trial (1992), Facing the Truth (1999)
Politics – In Search of the Constitution (1987), The Home Front (1991), Money Talks (1994), Trading Democracy (2002), Capitol Crimes (2006)
The media – The Public Mind (1989), Project Censored (1991), Free Speech for Sale (1999), The Net at Risk (2006)
Contemporary events such as the Iran–Contra affair (The Secret Government, 1987), 1988 presidential election (Election '88), 1992 presidential election (Listening to America) and the 9/11 attacks (Moyers in Conversation)
Healthcare – Circle of Recovery (1991), Healing and the Mind (1993), The Great Healthcare debate (1994), Moyers on Addiction: Close to Home (1998), On Our Own Terms: Moyers on Dying (2000)
Poetry – The Power of the Word (1989), The Language of Life (1995), Fooling with Words (1999), Sounds of Poetry (1999)
The environment – Spirit and Nature (1991), Trade Secrets (2001), Earth on Edge (2001), America's First River (2003), Is God Green? (2006)
Money – Sports for sale (1991), Minimum Wages: The New Economy (1992), Bullish on America (1993), Surviving the Good Times (2000)
Youth issues – All Our Children (1991), Families First (1992), Solutions to Violence (1995), Children in America's Schools (1996)
Immigration – Becoming American (2003)

These were often produced by Moyers and his wife, Judith Suzanne Davidson Moyers, through Public Affairs Television, a company they formed in 1986. Other collaborators included filmmaker David Grubin and producer Madeline Amgott

Frontline (1990–1999)
Between 1990 and 1999, Moyers produced and hosted 7 episodes of the PBS journalism program Frontline:
Global Dumping Ground (1990) on toxic waste
Springfield Goes to War (1990) on the debate around the Gulf War 
High Crimes and Misdemeanors (1990) on the Iran–Contra affair
In Our Children's Food (1993) on pesticides
Living on the Edge (1995) on the economy
Washington's Other Scandal (1998) on campaign finance
Justice for Sale (1999) on judicial elections

NOW with Bill Moyers and Wide Angle (2002–2005)
Moyers hosted the TV news journal NOW with Bill Moyers on PBS for three years, starting in January 2002. He retired from the program on December 17, 2004, but returned to PBS soon after to host Wide Angle in 2005. When he left NOW, he announced that he wished to finish writing a biography of Lyndon B. Johnson.

Bill Moyers Journal (2007–2010)
On April 25, 2007, Moyers returned to PBS with Bill Moyers Journal. In the first episode, "Buying the War", Moyers investigated what he called the general media's shortcomings in the runup to the War in Iraq. "Buying the War" won an Emmy at the 29th Annual News & Documentary Emmy Awards (2008) for Best Report in a News Magazine.

On November 20, 2009, Moyers announced that he would be retiring from his weekly show on April 30, 2010.

Moyers & Company (2012–2015)
In August 2011 Moyers announced a new hour-long weekly interview show, Moyers & Company, which premiered in January 2012. In that same month, Moyers also launched BillMoyers.com. Later reduced to a half hour, Moyers & Company was produced by Public Affairs Television and distributed by American Public Television. The show has been heralded as a renewed fulfillment of public media's stated mission to air news and views unrepresented or underrepresented in commercial media.

The program concluded on January 2, 2015.

Moyers on Democracy podcast
In 2020, Moyers started a series of podcasts named Moyers on Democracy. Conversations included Lisa Graves on the Post Office conflict; Heather Cox Richardson on How the South Won the Civil War; Heather McGhee on racism's pernicious effect on American society and Bill T. Jones on his newest project — a retelling of Moby Dick from the viewpoint of a Black cabin boy. The series ended in early 2021.

Awards 
In 1995, Bill Moyers was inducted into the Television Hall of Fame. The same year, he also won the Walter Cronkite Award for Excellence in Journalism. When he became a recipient of the 2006 Lifetime Emmy Award, the official announcement noted that “Bill Moyers has devoted his lifetime to the exploration of the major issues and ideas of our time and our country, giving television viewers an informed perspective on political and societal concerns," and that "The scope of and quality of his broadcasts have been honored time and again. It is fitting that the National Academy of Television Arts and Sciences honor him with our highest honor—the Lifetime Achievement Award." He has received well over thirty Emmys and virtually every other major television journalism prize, including a gold baton from the Alfred I. duPont-Columbia University Awards, a lifetime Peabody Award, and a George Polk Career Award (his third George Polk Award) for contributions to journalistic integrity and investigative reporting. He is a member of the American Academy of Arts and Letters, the American Philosophical Society, and has been the recipient of numerous honorary degrees, including a doctorate from the American Film Institute. In 2011, Moyers received the honorary Doctor of Humane Letters (L.H.D.) from Whittier College.

Media criticism

In a 2003 interview with BuzzFlash.com,
Moyers said, "The corporate right and the political right declared class warfare on working people a quarter of a century ago and they've won." He noted, "The rich are getting richer, which arguably wouldn't matter if the rising tide lifted all boats." Instead, however, "[t]he inequality gap is the widest it's been since 1929; the middle class is besieged and the working poor are barely keeping their heads above water." He added that as "the corporate and governing elites are helping themselves to the spoils of victory," access to political power has become "who gets what and who pays for it."

Meanwhile, the public has failed to react because it is, in his words, "distracted by the media circus and news has been neutered or politicized for partisan purposes." In support of this, he referred to "the paradox of Rush Limbaugh, ensconced in a Palm Beach mansion massaging the resentments across the country of white-knuckled wage earners, who are barely making ends meet in no small part because of the corporate and ideological forces for whom Rush has been a hero. ... As Eric Alterman reports in his recent book—a book that I'm proud to have helped make happen—part of the red-meat strategy is to attack mainstream media relentlessly, knowing that if the press is effectively intimidated, either by the accusation of liberal bias or by a reporter's own mistaken belief in the charge's validity, the institutions that conservatives revere—corporate America, the military, organized religion, and their own ideological bastions of influence—will be able to escape scrutiny and increase their influence over American public life with relatively no challenge."

When he briefly retired in December 2004, the AP News Service quoted Moyers as saying, "I'm going out telling the story that I think is the biggest story of our time: how the right-wing media has become a partisan propaganda arm of the Republican National Committee. We have an ideological press that's interested in the election of Republicans, and a mainstream press that's interested in the bottom line. Therefore, we don't have a vigilant, independent press whose interest is the American people."

Presidential draft initiative
On July 24, 2006, liberal political commentator Molly Ivins published an article entitled Run Bill Moyers for President, Seriously, urging a symbolic candidacy, on the progressive website Truthdig. The call was taken up in October 2006 by Ralph Nader. Moyers did not run.

Conflict with CPB over content
In 2003, Corporation for Public Broadcasting chairman Kenneth Tomlinson wrote to Pat Mitchell, the president of PBS, that NOW with Bill Moyers "does not contain anything approaching the balance the law requires for public broadcasting." In 2005, Tomlinson commissioned a study of the show, without informing or getting authorization from the CPB board.  The study was conducted by Fred Mann, Tomlinson's choice, a 20-year veteran of the American Conservative Union and a conservative columnist. Like the study itself, Mann's appointment was not disclosed to the CPB.

Tomlinson said that the study supported what he characterized as "the image of the left-wing bias of NOW". George Neumayr, the executive editor of The American Spectator, a conservative magazine, told the NewsHour with Jim Lehrer that "PBS looks like a liberal monopoly to me, and Bill Moyers is Exhibit A of that very strident, left-wing bias... [Moyers] uses his show as a platform from which to attack conservatives and Republicans."

The Reporters Committee on the Freedom of the Press was vocal about the danger of the CPB chairman interfering with programming independence. The PBS Ombudsman and the Free Press noted that a poll taken in 2003 by the CPB itself found that 80 percent of Americans believe PBS to be "fair and balanced."  In a speech given to The National Conference for Media Reform, Moyers said that he had repeatedly invited Tomlinson to have a televised conversation with him on the subject but had been ignored.

On November 3, 2005, Tomlinson resigned from the board, prompted by a report of his tenure by the CPB Inspector General Kenneth Konz, requested by Democrats in the U.S. House of Representatives. The report, which found that Tomlinson violated the Director's Code of Ethics and the statutory provisions of the CPB and PBS, was made public on November 15. It states:We found evidence that the Corporation for Public Broadcasting (CPB) former Chairman violated statutory provisions and the Director's Code of Ethics by dealing directly with one of the creators of a new public affairs program during negotiations with the Public Broadcasting Service (PBS) and the CPB over creating the show. Our review also found evidence that suggests "political tests" were a major criteria [sic] used by the former Chairman in recruiting a President/Chief Executive Officer (CEO) for CPB, which violated statutory prohibitions against such practices.In 2006, the PBS Ombudsman, whose role was reinvigorated by the controversy published a column entitled "He's Back: Moyers, not Tomlinson." Reflecting on the conflict, Moyers told The Boston Globe: "It's a place where if you fight you can survive, but it's not easy. The fact of the matter is that Kenneth Tomlinson had a chilling effect down the line."

Organizations
Moyers is a former director of the Council on Foreign Relations (1967–1974), and a member of the Bilderberg Group and since 1990 has been president of the Schumann Center for Media and Democracy.

Personal life

Moyers married Judith Suzanne Davidson (a producer) on December 18, 1954. They have three children and five grandchildren. His son William Cope Moyers (CNN producer, Hazelden Foundation spokesman) struggled to overcome alcoholism and crack addiction as detailed in the book Broken: My Story of Addiction and Redemption. He includes letters from Bill Moyers in his book, which he says are "a testament to a father's love for his son, a father's confusion with his son, and ultimately, a father's satisfaction with his son." His other son, John Moyers, assisted in the foundation of TomPaine.com, "an online public affairs journal of progressive analysis and commentary." His daughter, Suzanne Moyers, a former teacher and editor, is the author of the historical novel, ‘Til All These Thing Be Done (She Writes Press; September 13, 2022).

Published works
Listening to America: A Traveler Rediscovers His Country (1971), Harper's Magazine Press, 
The Secret Government: The Constitution in Crisis : With Excerpts from an Essay on Watergate (1988), coauthor Henry Steele Commager, Seven Locks Press, hardcover: , 1990 reprint: , 2000 paperback: ; examines the Iran-Contra affair
The Power of Myth (1988), host: Bill Moyers, author: Joseph Campbell, Doubleday, 
A World of Ideas : Conversations With Thoughtful Men and Women About American Life Today and the Ideas Shaping Our Future (1989), Doubleday, hardcover: , paperback: 
A World of Ideas II: Public Opinions from Private Citizens (1990), Doubleday, hardcover: , paperback: , 1994 Random House values edition: 
Healing and the Mind (1993), Doubleday hardcover: , 1995 paperback: 
The Language of Life: A Festival of Poets (1995), Doubleday hardcover: , 1996 paperback: , conversations with 34 poets
Genesis: A Living Conversation (1996), Doubleday hardcover: , 1997 paperback: 
Sister Wendy in Conversation with Bill Moyers: The Complete Conversation (1997), WGBH Educational Foundation, 
Fooling with Words: A Celebration of Poets and Their Craft (1999), William Morrow, hardcover: , 2000 Harper paperback: 
Moyers on America: A Journalist and His Times (2004), New Press, 2005 Anchor paperback: ; twenty selected speeches and commentaries, Interview with Terri Gross on Fresh Air.
Moyers on Democracy (2008), Doubleday, 
 Bill Moyers Journal: The Conversation Continues (2011), New Press

See also
Path to War

References

External links

 Bill Moyers website and video library
 Essays by Bill Moyers
 Bill Moyers channel on Vimeo
 Bill Moyers appearances on C-SPAN
 Bill Moyers appearances on Charlie Rose
 
 Bill Moyers Soundcloud channel
 Bill Moyers on Inequality in America
 Bill Moyers January 2007 Address to the National Conference for Media, Memphis, Tennessee 'Life on the Plantation'
 Bill Moyers Speech at 2008 National Conference for Media Reform (video)
 Bill Moyers: "The Radical Right Wing Is Very Close to Achieving a Longtime Goal of Undermining the Independence of Public Broadcasting" – interview on Democracy Now!
 Bill Moyers Howard Zinn Lecture (video) Bill Moyers lecture at Boston University

|-

20th-century American journalists
21st-century American journalists
1934 births
Alumni of the University of Edinburgh
American male journalists
American media critics
American television news anchors
Baptists from Texas
Emmy Award winners
George Polk Award recipients
Living people
Lyndon B. Johnson administration personnel
Members of the Steering Committee of the Bilderberg Group
National Humanities Medal recipients
Newsday people
Peabody Award winners
People from Bernardsville, New Jersey
People from Hugo, Oklahoma
People from Marshall, Texas
Southwestern Baptist Theological Seminary alumni
Texas Democrats
United Church of Christ members
Moody College of Communication alumni
White House Press Secretaries
Baptists from Oklahoma
Recipients of the Four Freedoms Award
Members of the American Philosophical Society